Aiyappan Pillai Madhavan Nair (1905–1990), also known as Nair-san, was closely involved with Japan in the Indian independence movement at 1920s-1940s.

History
Nair did his basic schooling in southern India. Nair had to leave Kerala at 18 as he led protests against some administrative steps taken by Education authorities in Travancore. At that time he had also spoken against the British. He studied engineering in Japan at Kyoto University.
After a short stint as an engineer he entered India's Freedom Struggle in his own individual capacity and soon teamed up with Rash Behari Bose.
When Japan joined the Second World War, Nair helped in setting up the Indian Independence League in Japan under Rash Behari Bose and later he and Rashbehari Bose advised Japan Government to bring Subhas Chandra Bose to Japan. When Subhas came he helped him in various ways.

In 1949, Nair founded an Indian restaurant in Ginza, Tokyo.

He wrote his Autobiography in 1982. It is called An Indian freedom fighter in Japan: Memoirs of A.M. Nair (1982) Sole distributorship, Ashok Uma Publications

Last years
Nair was given the Order of the Sacred Treasure (Kun zuihosho) by Emperor Hirohito in November 1984. He died on 22 April 1990.

Film
A film titled Nair-san starring Mohanlal and Jackie Chan has been planned based on his life, directed by Alberrt Antoni.

Autobiography
An Indian freedom fighter in Japan: Memoirs of A.M. Nair (1982) Sole distributorship, Ashok Uma Publications

References

External links
 GINZA NAIR'S RESTAURANT, founded by A. M. Nair in 1949

1905 births
1990 deaths
Indian expatriates in Japan
Kyoto University alumni
People from Thiruvananthapuram
Indian independence activists from Kerala
Indian revolutionaries